The  Clinton B. Ford Observatory (Wrightwood) (Observatory Code 674) is an astronomical observatory that is associated historically with the American Association of Variable Star Observers (AAVSO).  The observatory is located near the border of the Angeles National Forest and the San Bernardino National Forest near Wrightwood, California (United States).  It was founded by the late astronomer Clinton B. Ford.

In 2012, the Clinton B. Ford Observatory was donated to the Los Angeles Astronomical Society (LAAS).

Telescope

The observatory contains an 18-inch, f/7 newtonian reflector.

Nearby observatory

Table Mountain Observatory, Wrightwood, California

See also
 List of observatory codes

References

External links
 AAVSO website
 LAAS website

Astronomical observatories in California
Angeles National Forest
Buildings and structures in San Bernardino County, California
San Gabriel Mountains
Wrightwood, California